Robert Patterson Lamont (December 1, 1867February 20, 1948) was United States Secretary of Commerce March 5, 1929 to August 7, 1932, during the administration of Herbert Hoover. He was commerce secretary during difficult times for commerce, as a result of the Great Depression.

Life 

Lamont was born in Detroit, Michigan on December 1, 1867, to Isabella (née Patterson) and Robert Lamont. He was educated at the University of Michigan, graduating in 1891 with a degree in civil engineering. He worked as an engineer at the 1893 World's Columbian Exposition in Chicago, Illinois. Lamont married Helen Gertrude Trotter on October 24, 1894. They had three children: (Robert Patterson II, Gertrude and Dorothy Lamont). In 1897, he was hired by the Simplex Railway Appliance Company as first vice president. In 1905, the company was bought out by American Steel Foundries and Lamont remained a vice president. In 1912, he was appointed company president, a position he held until his Hoover administration appointment in 1929. Lamont was Secretary of Commerce  from 1929 until 1932, when he resigned in order to become president of the American Iron and Steel Institute, where he stayed until 1934. Lamont died in Chicago, Illinois, in 1948. His grandson, Robert L. Belknap, was a professor of Russian literature at Columbia University.

References

1867 births
1948 deaths
Hoover administration cabinet members
20th-century American politicians
Politicians from Chicago
Politicians from Detroit
People from Lake Forest, Illinois
People from Vilas County, Wisconsin
United States Secretaries of Commerce
University of Michigan College of Engineering alumni